Sting Energy (or Sting) is a carbonated energy drink from PepsiCo International and produced by Rockstar Inc. Sting is available in flavours such as original Gold Rush, Gold (with Ginseng), Power Pacq (Gold Rush with Malunggay), Power Lime (Kiwifruit/Lime) and Berry Blast (Strawberry).

Ingredients
Ingredients include carbonated water, sugar, citric acid, artificial flavor, maltodextrin, sodium citrate, sodium hexametaphosphate, potassium sorbate, caffeine, sodium benzoate, tartrazine, inositol, calcium disodium EDTA, modified food starch, Panax ginseng extract, niacinamide, sunset yellow, pyridoxine hydrochloride, and cyanocobalamin.

Nutritional information
Serving size: 200ml

References

Energy drinks
PepsiCo brands